George Ian Stankovich is a former New Zealand boxer.

Stankovich won a bronze medal for his country in the heavyweight division at the 1978 Commonwealth Games in Edmonton. He won his first bout against the Kenyan boxer Joseph Kabegi, but then lost in the semifinal against the eventual gold medallist, Julius Awome from England.

References

Year of birth missing (living people)
Boxers at the 1978 Commonwealth Games
Commonwealth Games bronze medallists for New Zealand
New Zealand male boxers
Commonwealth Games medallists in boxing
Heavyweight boxers
Living people
Medallists at the 1978 Commonwealth Games